I quatro rusteghi (The Four Curmudgeons, The Four Ruffians, in Edward J. Dent's translation School for Fathers, also translated by James Benner as Foolish Fathers ) is a comic opera in three acts, music by Ermanno Wolf-Ferrari to a libretto by  and Giuseppe Pizzolato based on Carlo Goldoni's 18th-century play I rusteghi. The opera is written in Venetian dialect, hence "quatro" instead of "quattro".

Performance history

The opera was first performed as Die vier Grobiane in German at the Hoftheater in Munich on 19 March 1906. Its first performance in Italian was on 2 June 1914 at the Teatro Lirico in Milan under Ettore Panizza. The work was first performed in the United States by the New York City Opera on 19 October 1951 with Laszlo Halasz conducting. Wolf-Ferrari's most successful full-length work, it is still regularly performed.

Roles

Synopsis
The action takes place in 18th century Venice.

Four curmudgeonly husbands vainly attempt to keep their women in order.
The women decide to teach their menfolk a lesson by allowing Lunardo's daughter Lucieta to see Filipeto, the son of Maurizio, before their pre-arranged marriage, even though the men have forbidden this.

References
Notes

Sources
 Anderson, James, The Complete Dictionary of Opera & Operetta Wings Books, 1993

External links

Die vier Grobiane libretto 
I quatro rusteghi libretto 

Operas
Operas by Ermanno Wolf-Ferrari
Italian-language operas
German-language operas
1906 operas
Operas based on plays
Operas set in Venice